Maretsch Castle is a castle located in the historic center of Bolzano, South Tyrol, northern Italy. It is a residence rather than a defense construction.

The oldest part of the castle dates back to the 13th century. The present form is due to the members of the Römer family, who transformed it in a Renaissance castle between 1560 and 1570.

Today the castle is a convention center, but it can be visited after previous reservation.

External links 

 
Südtirol-Altoadige - Maretsch Castle

Houses completed in the 13th century
Castles in South Tyrol
Buildings and structures in Bolzano